Borne  (German Borne) is a settlement in the administrative district of Gmina Dębno, within Myślibórz County, West Pomeranian Voivodeship, in northwestern Poland.

The settlement has a population of four.

References

Villages in Myślibórz County